Chesapeake Square is a  regional mall in Chesapeake, Virginia, in the Hampton Roads metropolitan area. The mall has approximately 70 stores, four anchors (Burlington, Cinemark Theatres, JCPenney, and Target), several eateries at the mall's food court including one restaurant: Big Woody's (located at the mall's main entry).

History
The mall opened in October 1989 in former forest and swamp land of the Western Branch section of Chesapeake. Later, the business district grew with two other shopping centers including the adjacent "Chesapeake Center" as well as "The Crossroads at Chesapeake Square" across the street.

The mall was developed by the Edward J. DeBartolo Corporation.  The mall's anchors at the time of its opening in 1989 were JCPenney, Sears, Hess's, and Leggett. 

Montgomery Ward opened in 1992. When it closed in 2001, its building was expanded for use by Target.

Hecht's opened as an anchor in 1999. It became Macy's, along with all other Hecht's stores, in 2006.

On July 27, 2009, Dillard's announced that it would close its two Chesapeake Square locations, along with four other undisclosed locations, laying off or transferring 45 employees. In September 2009, the Men's building (originally Leggett until 1996, later Belk until 1998) closed. On September 23, the Women's building, (originally Hess's until 1993, later Proffitt's until 1997), closed as well.

Burlington Coat Factory replaced Dillard's Men's on September 24, 2010.

On November 12, 2010, a Cinemark movie theater moved to the former Dillard's Women/Hess's anchor space. The theater has stadium seating with twelve screens, including an Extreme Digital (XD) auditorium and opened at December 16, 2011.  In December 2017, the old Cinemark building was demolished.

Sears announced the closure of its Chesapeake Square store in late 2014.

The mall was previously owned by Simon Property Group, until it spun off numerous properties to Washington Prime Group in 2014. Jones Lang LaSalle owned and managed the property until Virginia Beach-based Kotarides acquired the mall for $12.9 million in February 2018.

Macy's announced the closure of its store by early 2016. This left JCPenney as the last original anchor.

In October 2021, it was announced that JCPenney would be leaving the mall by 2022 leaving no original anchors left at the mall.

On December 9th, 2022, Pete Kortarides President of the VB based Kortarides Development said Demolition of the former Macy's, JcPenney and Sears could began as next year to be replaced unnamed retailers.

References

Shopping malls in Virginia
Shopping malls established in 1989
Buildings and structures in Chesapeake, Virginia
1989 establishments in Virginia